See Nekrasov Cossacks for another meaning

Nekrasovite is a rare copper vanadium sulfosalt mineral with formula . It crystallizes in the isometric system and occurs as small grains in ore aggregates. It is a brown opaque metallic mineral with Mohs hardness of 4.5 and a specific gravity of 4.62. 

It was first described in 1984 in the Khayragatsch ore deposit of eastern Uzbekistan and named for Russian mineralogist Ivan Yakovlevich Nekrasov (born 1929).

References
Mindat data with locations 
Webmineral data
Mineral Data Publishing - PDF

Copper minerals
Vanadium minerals
Sulfosalt minerals
Cubic minerals
Minerals in space group 218